Mervyn Ian Guy Hamilton, DSC (16 September 1922 – 20 April 2016) was an English film director. He directed 22 films from the 1950s to the 1980s, including four James Bond films.

Early life
Hamilton was born in Paris on 16 September 1922, where his English parents were living, and attended school in England. His first exposure to the film industry came in 1938, when he was a clapperboard boy at the Victorine Studios in Nice. At the outbreak of the Second World War in 1939, Hamilton escaped from France by the MV Saltersgate, a collier bound for French North Africa; one of the other 500 refugees aboard was W. Somerset Maugham. 

Having travelled from Oran to Gibraltar before arriving in London, he worked in the film library at Paramount News before being commissioned in the Royal Navy; he served in the 15th Motor Torpedo  Boat 718 Flotilla, a unit that ferried agents into France and brought downed British pilots back to England. 

During this service, he was left behind for a month in occupied Brittany; he was later awarded the Distinguished Service Cross.

Career

Assistant Director
After the war Hamilton wanted to get into film production and managed to get a job on a second unit in Dartmoor on a Trevor Heid picture. Then he was put under contract by Alexander Korda as a third assistant director. Over the next few years he worked his way up to a first assistant director.

Hamilton later said, "I found that working with bad directors was infinitely more useful because you watched them get into trouble three times a day and puddle around and you say, you know, I won't do that, I don't want to fall into that trap."

He worked on They Made Me a Fugitive (1947), Mine Own Executioner (1947), Anna Karenina (1948),  and The Fallen Idol (1949) directed by Carol Reed. "I was devoted to Carol," said Hamilton later. "He made my life easy because I followed him around like a little dog while learning my trade. If you’d ask him a question, he’d always answer it...Carol Reed was the biggest influence on me and on everything that I did."

Hamilton assisted on Britannia Mews (1949), a 20th Century Fox film shot in England, directed by Jean Negulesco; was reunited with Reed on The Third Man (1949), in which Hamilton doubled for Orson Welles in a couple of shots; The Angel with the Trumpet (1950), State Secret (1950) for Sidney Gilliat; Outcast of the Islands (1951) for Reed; The African Queen (1951) for John Huston; and Home at Seven (1952) for Ralph Richardson.

Early films as director
Reed suggested to Hamilton that if he wanted to direct he should refuse to re-sign with Korda unless he gave Hamilton a chance to direct. It worked and Korda allocated Hamilton the job of directing the B-movie [[The Ringer (1952 film)|The Ringer]] (1952).

Hamilton's second film as director was The Intruder (1953) dealing with soldiers returning to civilian life, produced by Ivan Foxwell. He followed it with an adaptation of An Inspector Calls (1954).

Hamilton's fourth film was the prisoner-of-war story The Colditz Story (1955), which he also co-wrote with producer Foxwell. It was  his highest-grossing movie of the decade.  He also tried a musical with Max Bygraves, Charley Moon (1956) and an adventure film which he co wrote with Foxwell, Manuela (1957).

Hamilton had his first experience with larger-budget films towards the end of the decade, when he replaced the sacked Alexander Mackendrick on the set of The Devil's Disciple (1959) featuring Kirk Douglas and Burt Lancaster.

After A Touch of Larceny (1960), which he co wrote with producer Foxwell, Hamilton again found himself working with a war theme on the Dino De Laurentiis-produced Italian war comedy The Best of Enemies (1961). This was the first film to show Hamilton's skill with intricate set-piece action sequences. 

He turned down an offer to direct Dr. No (1962), the first James Bond film. His next release, and somewhat outside his developing œuvre, was The Party's Over, which, though filmed in 1963, was not released until 1965. The film was heavily censored and, in protest, Hamilton asked for his name to be removed when the film was finally released.  He directed Man in the Middle (1964) with Robert Mitchum.

James Bond
Hamilton followed with his first James Bond film, Goldfinger (1964). He later reflected that he was able to successfully merge the series' mix of action adventure, sexual innuendo and black humour. 

In the late 1960s, Hamilton directed two further films for Bond producer Harry Saltzman: Funeral in Berlin (1966, starring Michael Caine), and the war epic Battle of Britain (1969). 

He returned to the Bond film franchise with the chase- and gadget-dependent Diamonds Are Forever (1971), Live and Let Die (1973) and The Man with the Golden Gun (1974). He claimed in a much later interview that he had instructed Roger Moore not to mimic Sean Connery's rendition of James Bond and said the only Bond he regretted making was Golden Gun. Hamilton was later asked to direct For Your Eyes Only (1981) but declined because the cash-strapped United Artists could not afford his salary.

Hamilton was originally chosen to direct Superman: The Movie (1978), but, owing to his status as a tax exile, he was allowed to be in England for only thirty days, where production had moved at the last minute to Pinewood Studios. The job of director was then passed to Richard Donner, but Hamilton insisted he be paid in full. 

Hamilton's only films in the latter part of the 1970s were the commercially unsuccessful Force 10 from Navarone (1978) and the poorly received adaptation of Agatha Christie's mystery The Mirror Crack'd (1980).  

Another Christie adaptation followed in 1982, with Evil Under the Sun which was received more favourably than The Mirror Crack'd. 

Hamilton directed only two more films in the 1980s (Remo Williams: The Adventure Begins in 1985 and 1989's Try This One for Size) before retiring.

In the late 1980s he was approached to direct Batman (1989), but declined. In a 2003 interview, he said that the contemporary Bond films relied too heavily on special effects and not as much on the spectacular and risky stunts of the Bond films of his era.

"I know that I’ve made some bad pictures, but when I was making a film, I knew I had to do the best I could with the material that I was working with," he said. "Sometimes I wished I had a more cooperative or a better writer, but that's the same for everybody."

Death
Hamilton died at the age of 93 on 20 April 2016.

Personal life
Hamilton was married twice, first to Naomi Chance in 1953, and then to the actress Kerima in 1964, many years after they first met during the filming of Outcast of the Islands. They lived in a villa in Andratx on the Mediterranean island of Mallorca from the mid-1970s until his death.

Filmography

James Bond
 Goldfinger (1964)
 Diamonds Are Forever (1971)
 Live and Let Die (1973)
 The Man with the Golden Gun (1974)

Other films
 The Ringer (1952)
 The Intruder (1953)
 An Inspector Calls (1954)
 The Colditz Story (1955) (also co-writer)
 Charley Moon (1956)
 Manuela (1957)
 A Touch of Larceny (1959)
 The Devil's Disciple (1959)
 The Best of Enemies (1961)
 Man in the Middle (1964)
 The Party's Over (1965)
 Funeral in Berlin (1966)
 Battle of Britain (1969)
 Force 10 from Navarone (1978)
 The Mirror Crack'd (1980)
 Evil Under the Sun (1982)
 Remo Williams: The Adventure Begins (1985)
 Try This One for Size'' (1989)

References

External links
 
 Guy Hamilton at BFI Screenonline
 
 
 

1922 births
2016 deaths
Action film directors
British expatriates in France
English film directors
English male screenwriters
Recipients of the Distinguished Service Cross (United Kingdom)
Royal Navy officers of World War II